West Lombok Regency is a regency of the Indonesian Province of West Nusa Tenggara. It is located on the island of Lombok and the administrative capital is the town of Gerung. The regency covers an area of 1,053.92 km2 and had a population of 599,609 at the 2010 census and 721,481 at the 2020 census; the official estiimate as at mid 2021 was 731,810.

Location 
West Lombok Regency is bounded by North Lombok Regency to the north, Central Lombok Regency to the east and the Lombok Strait to the west. To the northeast of the regency is Mount Rinjani which at 3,726 m is the third highest mountain the second-largest volcano in the country and is and an active volcano The oldest recorded historical eruption was in 1847 and last eruption was in May 2010.

History 
The regency of West Lombok was established in 1958 and included the northern section of Lombok subsequently separated as the regency of North Lombok. The West Lombok Administrative Region previously oversaw the West coast, Ampenan, Tanjung, Bayan, Gerung, Gondang and Cakranegara.

In 1993 the West Lombok District was separated into two autonomous divisions. As a consequence of the separation of the city of Mataram from the West Lombok Regency in 2000, the capital of West Lombok Regency was moved from Mataram to Gerung in the south of the regency. This move resulted the five districts in the northwestern end of the island being too far away from the services of the West Lombok Regency HQ at Gerung. Subsequently, in 2008 (and with the full support of the local government of West Lombok Regency) North Lombok established its own regency government situated at Tanjung. The northwest of the island now functions autonomously from the West Lombok Regency.

Administration 
The area of West Lombok Regency is 1053.92 km2

Administrative structure 
Kabupaten Lombok Barat (West Lombok Regency) is one of Lombok's four Regencies or administrative regions.

 TGH M Zainul Majdi, MA., governor of NTB (West Nusa Tenggara), (Mataram is the provincial capital of West Nusa Tenggara).
 Dr. H. Zaini Arony, M.Pd. regent (bupati) of Kabupaten, Lombok Barat (West Lombok Regency).

Administrative boundaries 

Subsequent to the inauguration of the newly elected bupati, tensions rose in Lembah Sari village in late September 2010. A border dispute over the new regency boundaries had been in disputation since July 2010 when the previously ratified border alignment became clear to villagers. Apparently the new border dividing the North Lombok Regency from West Lombok Regency traversed the village of Lembah Sari situated west of Pemenang. Residents felled a large tree on the side of the main inland road connecting the North Lombok Regency to that of West Lombok Regency and the City of Mataram so that it blocked the road. Residents claimed that they established the roadblock to protest a unilateral decision by officials in North Lombok to move the border between the two districts. A police detachment re-opened the road after seven hours of blockade by villagers from the 14 hamlets that form Lembah Sari. The police intervention allowed workers from West Lombok Regency to commence work to clear the road and limited through traffic was restored. The North Lombok Regency made public statements to clarify that district authorities would abide by whatever decision was made by the provincial government regarding regency boundaries. Thirty-four villages formerly part of West Lombok are now part of North Lombok.

Administrative districts 
West Lombok Regency consists of ten districts (kecamatan), tabulated below with their areas and their populations at the 2010 census and the 2020 census, together with the official estimates as at mid 2021. The table also includes the locations of the district administrative centres, the number of administrative villages (rural desa and urban kelurahan) in each district, and its postal codes.

Notes: (a) covers the Sekotong Peninsula, including 35 islands off the southwest corner of Lombok Island. (b) the 2010 total includes 696 inhabitants in Lainnya (outside administrative districts).

The ten districts are subdivided into 119 rural Desa and 3 urban Kelurahan ("villages"); the latter are all in Gerung District.

Land use 
, or 45.16% of the total area of West Lombok Regency, are protected forest.

Remaining land is used for livestock and fisheries. Exploration for gold, silver and copper is becoming increasingly important in the southwest part of the regency, especially in Sekotong subdistrict. It is providing good incomes as well as occupational training to local inhabitants who work for the mining companies.

Population

Decennial census results
The 2020 census resulted in a total of 721,481 inhabitants, up from 599,609 at the 2010 census.

Ethnicity 
The Sasak people are the indigenous people of Lombok and form the majority of West Lombok's residents. West Lombok is also home to people of Balinese, Chinese, Tionghoa-peranakan people of mixed Indonesian and Chinese descent and small number of Arab Indonesian people, mainly of Yemeni descent who settled in the early port city of Ampenan.

Religion 
Islam is the religion of the majority population of West Lombok. Other religions practised in West Lombok are Christianity, Catholicism, Hinduism, Buddhism, and Confucianism.

Language 
Most people in West Lombok normally speak the Sasak language as it is the native language of the indigenous people of Lombok. The Indonesian language is the language most widely used in everyday interactions at places such as hotels, larger shops in the township of Senggigi and in the government offices. When at home or a place of recreation West Lombok residents tend to use local western Lombok dialects of the Sasak language.

Services and development 

Most of the region's services are provided from Mataram. Regional government (regency) services are centred at Gerung.
The region is agrarian in activity with rice, copra, casava, timber and other crops. Rainfall is lower in the south of the regency and higher in the north as the land rises toward Mount Rinjani. Rinjani supplies a rainfall catchment area to the region and several eastern Lombok rivers flow from its slopes. The sea supports a small local fishing industry, a pearl industry and prawn farming. Mineral exploration for gold, silver and copper forms an increasingly important activity.

The growing tourism industry in Lombok has affected the western region's historical dependence on fishing and land-based agrarian pursuits.
It is anticipated that the opening of the new Lombok International Airport will possibly lead to an increase in tourism-related business and development in West Lombok in coming years.

In 2000, the capital of West Lombok District was moved from Mataram to Gerung in the south of the district. This has seen this town developed as a centre of administration and many new regional government offices have been constructed there. This location in the south of the regency was in part responsible for the later division of West Lombok into two regencies: West Lombok Regency and North Lombok Regency. During 2009–2010 infrastructure upgrades were commenced to provide better communications along the western coast, including roadworks and fibre-optic cable installation.

Mataram is officially the provincial capital of West Nusa Tenggara and the administrative offices of TGH M Zainul Majdi, MA., governor of NTB (West Nusa Tenggara).

Transportation 

Public ferries connect from Bali to Tanjung Lembar in the south west of the island Lembar and provide services for both passengers and vehicles. Tanjung Lembar is Lombok's main port and handles small freighters, fishing boats and the combination vehicle and passenger ferries that cross the Lombok straight to Padangbai in Bali.
 Lombok Strait: Lembar Lombok – Padang Bai, Bali, with 12 ferries providing crossings once every hour.
 Alat Strait: Labuhan Lombok – Pototano, Sumbawa with 8 ferries providing 18 crossings per day.
Labuhan Lombok seaport on the east coast of the island provides facilities for vehicle and passenger ferries eastward to Sumbawa.

These drive on, drive off ferries provide the principal facilities for road transport movements in and out of Lombok. Disruptions on these routes can significantly affect trade and the provision of supplies to the island as the shipping operators on these routes will often suspend services due to breakdown or heavy seas.

Private charter boats provide access between Senggigi, the Gili Islands and Teluk Nare. Some of the scheduled services connect Senggigi across the Lombok strait westward to Bali via the Gili islands.

Fast speedboat services are also available connecting to Teluk Nare a little south of Bangsal and to Gili islands.

Public buses and Bemo run along the west coast from the south in Mataram/Cakranegara/Sweta and also through Pusuk mountain pass to connect Tanjung and North Lombok to Mataram and Cakranegara. Limited services are available to the east coast connecting through Cakranegara, Sweta, Praya and south toward Kuta and Tanjung Lembar in the south west of the island.

West Lombok is served by the Lombok International Airport (Bandara Internasional Lombok) .
The new airport provides domestic terminal facilities serving destinations in Java, Bali and Sumbawa. The main terminal building also provides international terminal facilities. International flights to Kuala Lumpur provided by Garuda and Merpati airlines depart from the domestic terminal section of the building.

The new international airport will be suitable for wide bodied aircraft operations will provide more modern terminal facilities, and improved cargo handling capacity.

Lombok International Airport is south west of Praya in south Central Lombok. The airport commenced operations on 1 October 2011 replacing the previous international and domestic facilities at Selaparang Airport near Ampenan in West Lombok Regency which formally closed for operations on the evening of 30 September 2011. All services previously operated at the Selaparang airport were moved across to the new airport at that time.

Pelni shipping lines provide inter-island sea connections for passenger travel throughout the archipelago of Indonesia, Pelni Shipping Lines have offices in Ampenan in west Lombok.

Tourism 

The western coast of Lombok has the most intensive tourism activity. Senggigi and the coastal strip to the south of the township toward Montong and north to the West Lombok Regency's border at Klui have many hotels, restaurants, bars clubs and other entertainment and accommodation facilities. Mount Rinjani and the Gili Islands are further up the west coast in North Lombok Regency.

The newly upgraded west coast highway and the road from Mataram through the Pusuk pass connect the West Lombok Regency to the North Lombok Regency and are important tourism conduits unifying the islands tourism sector. The inland oriented Pusak pass road passes through attractive mountain and river gorges and has a population of monkeys that live in the nearby Monkey Forest park and Forest reserve. Bangsal and Tanjunk Teluk near Pemenang provide services connecting across the short distance of water to the Gili islands off the Sire Peninsular just south of Tanjung. The coastal highway has become a popular scenic route since the commencement of a comprehensive upgrade programme in 2008–2010. A little further to the north in the North Lombok Regency are the small townships of Bayan and Senaru which offer the main gateways to access Mount Rinjani, and Bangsal which provides a public ferry service to the nearby Gilli islands. Charter boats and ferries are active from Senggigi and Mangsit taking tourists to and from the west Lombok and north Lombok regions. Shuttle bus, hire cars, taxis and bemo services also provide links to the north.

Hotels in West Lombok Regency

Gili Mas New Port
Due to existing Lembar Port has only 10 Low Water Spring (LWS) and passengers from cruise ships should be disembarked and transferred by boat to the beach, so Port Authority decided to build Gili Mas New Port (near Lembar Port) with 16–18 LWS depth on totally 100 hectares land. The port also has container facilities and for the first stage projects will be operated at the end of 2018.

References 

Please see main Lombok article for more detail.

There are Four Regencies on the Island of Lombok.

External links 
 Kabupaten Lombok Utara the Regency of North Lombok
 Kabupaten Lombok Tengah, the Regency of Central Lombok
 Kabupaten Lombok Timur, the Regency of East Lombok
 Kabupaten Lombok Barat, the Regency of West Lombok
 Nusa Teggara Barat, West Nusa Teggara
 Kota Mataram, City of Mataram

Regencies of West Nusa Tenggara